Hendrawan (born 27 June 1972) is an Indonesian badminton coach and former player.

Personal life 
Hendrawan began to play badminton at 10 years old and began his top-level career at Cipayung National Training Center. He retired from the Indonesian team in 2003. He married his longtime girlfriend, former player Silvia Anggraini, the sister of Hendra Setiawan, on January 7, 2001. The couple has two children, daughter Josephine Sevilla and son Alexander Thomas. The second names of both children showing their parents love of badminton, the daughter is named after the city of  Seville, Spain, where Hendrawan was crowned World Champion in 2001 and the son Thomas after the Thomas Cup, which Hendrawan won three times, especially commemorating the 2002 edition were Hendrawan won the deciding 5th match in the final against Malaysian Roslin Hashim. He currently trains Malaysian badminton team players after stints in Indonesia as a national women's singles and then men's singles team coach.

Career 
Hendrawan began playing internationally in the early 1990s but at first was overshadowed by a number of his countrymen who rated among the world's elite players. His results gradually improved, peaking at the end of the decade and the beginning of the next. He earned a silver medal at the 2000 Summer Olympics in men's singles, and won men's singles the 2001 World Championships over Denmark's Peter Gade. Hendrawan was an outstanding Thomas Cup (men's world team) performer for Indonesia, winning each of his championship round singles matches in the 1998, 2000, 2002 editions won by Indonesia. In the last of these his final match victory over Malaysia's Roslin Hashim was decisive, breaking a 2–2 tie. Currently, he is working as a coach for Malaysia's national badminton team.

Achievements

Olympic Games 
Men's singles

IBF World Championships 
Men's singles

Asian Games 
Men's singles

Asian Championships 
Men's singles

IBF World Grand Prix (5 titles, 3 runners-up) 
The World Badminton Grand Prix sanctioned by International Badminton Federation (IBF) from 1983 to 2006.

Men's singles

 IBF Grand Prix tournament
 IBF Grand Prix Finals tournament

Record against selected opponents 
Includes results against athletes who competed in World Championships semifinals, and Olympic quarterfinals.

  Bao Chunlai 0–1
  Chen Hong 3–1
  Dong Jiong 3–1
  Ji Xinpeng 0–2
  Sun Jun 2–3
  Xia Xuanze 4–2
  Fung Permadi 1–2
  Peter Gade 2–1
  Poul-Erik Høyer 3–5
  Thomas Stuer-Lauridsen 1–5
  Tam Kai Chuen 4–0
  Pullela Gopichand 1–1
  Heryanto Arbi 1–3
  Taufik Hidayat 1–2
  Joko Suprianto 0–1
  Ardy B. Wiranata 2–0
  Lee Hyun-il 1–0
  Lee Kwang-jin 1–0
  Park Tae-sang 2–0
  Shon Seung-mo 0–1
  Ronald Susilo 0–2
  Boonsak Ponsana 1–0

References

External links 
 BWF Profile
 Hendrawan's profile  
 Hendrawan's results

1972 births
Living people
Sportspeople from Malang
Indonesian people of Chinese descent
Indonesian male badminton players
Badminton players at the 2000 Summer Olympics
Olympic badminton players of Indonesia
Olympic silver medalists for Indonesia
Olympic medalists in badminton
Medalists at the 2000 Summer Olympics
Badminton players at the 1998 Asian Games
Badminton players at the 2002 Asian Games
Asian Games gold medalists for Indonesia
Asian Games silver medalists for Indonesia
Asian Games bronze medalists for Indonesia
Asian Games medalists in badminton
Medalists at the 1998 Asian Games
Medalists at the 2002 Asian Games
Competitors at the 2001 Southeast Asian Games
Southeast Asian Games silver medalists for Indonesia
Southeast Asian Games medalists in badminton
Badminton coaches
Indonesian expatriate sportspeople in Malaysia